The following is an armorial of the individuals who have served as governor-general of the Commonwealth of Australia. 

Several Australian governors-general have been granted armorial achievements, commonly referred to as coats of arms, with many having been inherited.

Coats of arms of governors-general

Notes

See also

List of governors-general of Australia
Australian heraldry
Coat of arms of Australia
Armorial of the governors-general of New Zealand
Armorial of the governors general of Canada
Armorial of prime ministers of the United Kingdom
Armorial of the speakers of the British House of Commons

External links
Official Website of the Governor-General of Australia
The Australian Heraldry Society

References

Governors-General of Australia
Australian heraldry